Keydomar Giovanni Vallenilla Sánchez (born 8 October 1999) is a Venezuelan weightlifter. In 2021, he won the silver medal in the men's 96 kg event at the 2020 Summer Olympics in Tokyo, Japan. He won the gold medal in the men's 89kg event at the 2022 World Weightlifting Championships held in Bogotá, Colombia.

Career 

He won the bronze medal in the Clean & Jerk in the men's 89kg event at the 2018 World Weightlifting Championships held in Ashgabat, Turkmenistan. He also won the bronze medal in the Snatch in the men's 89kg event at the 2019 World Weightlifting Championships held in Pattaya, Thailand.

In 2019, he won the bronze medal in the men's 96kg event at the Pan American Games held in Lima, Peru.

In 2021, he won the silver medal in the men's 96 kg event at the 2020 Summer Olympics in Tokyo, Japan. He won the gold medal in his event at the 2021 Pan American Weightlifting Championships held in Guayaquil, Ecuador. In that same year, he won the bronze medal in the men's 96kg event at the 2021 World Weightlifting Championships held in Tashkent, Uzbekistan.

He won two medals, including gold, at the 2022 Bolivarian Games held in Valledupar, Colombia. He won the silver medal in his event at the 2022 Pan American Weightlifting Championships held in Bogotá, Colombia. He also set new Panamerican records in both the Snatch and the Clean & Jerk which were all improved upon during the competition by Brayan Rodallegas of Colombia.

He won the gold medal in the men's 96kg event at the 2022 South American Games held in Asunción, Paraguay. In December 2022, he won the gold medal in the men's 89kg event at the World Weightlifting Championships held in Bogotá, Colombia. In that same month, he was also elected as member of the IWF Athletes' Commission.

Achievements

References

External links 

 

Living people
1999 births
People from La Guaira
Venezuelan male weightlifters
Pan American Weightlifting Championships medalists
South American Games gold medalists for Venezuela
South American Games silver medalists for Venezuela
South American Games medalists in weightlifting
Competitors at the 2018 South American Games
Competitors at the 2022 South American Games
Weightlifters at the 2019 Pan American Games
Medalists at the 2019 Pan American Games
Pan American Games bronze medalists for Venezuela
Pan American Games medalists in weightlifting
Weightlifters at the 2020 Summer Olympics
Medalists at the 2020 Summer Olympics
Olympic silver medalists for Venezuela
Olympic medalists in weightlifting
World Weightlifting Championships medalists
Olympic weightlifters of Venezuela
21st-century Venezuelan people